Guerillas in tha Mist is the debut studio album by American hip hop group Da Lench Mob, who originally appeared on Ice Cube's debut solo album, AmeriKKKa's Most Wanted. The titular "Guerillas in tha Mist" was a hit at the release of the album. The album was produced by Ice Cube, who is also featured throughout the album though uncredited. The album peaked at number 24 on the Billboard 200, number 4 on the Top R&B/Hip-Hop Albums, and was certified Gold by the Recording Industry Association of America on December 18, 1992, indicating US sales of over 500,000 units. The single "Freedom Got an A.K." peaked at number 7 on the Hot Rap Songs.

The album title is a pun on the popular movie title Gorillas in the Mist and guerrilla warfare. In the post-Los Angeles riot atmosphere of the album's release, the title was also perceived as a clever reference to a comment made by one of the police officers who had arrested Rodney King. Laurence Michael Powell, one of King's arresting officers, had described through radio message a domestic disturbance involving two blacks as something straight from Gorillas in the Mist. Powell's comment was considered highly racist, comparing black people to gorillas, and was used against the officer during the Rodney King trial.

Critical reception

Track listing

Notes 
Tracks 2, 4, 5, 6 and 9 featured uncredited vocals by Ice Cube.

Personnel
Terry "T-Bone" Gray – vocals, co-producer
Jerome "Shorty" Muhammad – vocals
DaSean "J-Dee" Cooper – vocals
O'Shea Jackson – vocals (tracks: 2, 4-6, 9), producer, executive producer
Louis Freese – vocals (track 8)
Derrick A. Baker – co-producer
James Rashad Coes – co-producer
Mister Woody – co-producer
Bob Morris – engineering
Mike Calderon – engineering
Brian Knapp Gardner – mastering
Ed Korengo – mixing
Kevin Hosmann – art direction
Mario Castellanos – photography

Charts

Certifications

References

External links 

1992 debut albums
Atco Records albums
Da Lench Mob albums
East West Records albums
Political music albums by American artists
Race-related controversies in music